Moraea sisyrinchium (syn. Gynandriris sisyrinchium), the Barbary nut, is a species of flowering plant, a dwarf iris, in the genus Moraea, native to southern Europe and the Mediterranean region.

References

Plants described in 1805
sisyrinchium